Guyou Bay is a bay  wide, which indents the west coast of Brabant Island between Claude Point and Metchnikoff Point, in the Palmer Archipelago, Antarctica. Its head is fed by Dodelen, Oshane and Ralitsa Glaciers.

The bay was discovered by the French Antarctic Expedition, 1903–05, under Jean-Baptiste Charcot, who named it for Captain Emile Guyou of the French Navy, distinguished in the field of naval science and a member of the commission which published the scientific results of the expedition.

Maps 

 Antarctic Digital Database (ADD). Scale 1:250000 topographic map of Antarctica. Scientific Committee on Antarctic Research (SCAR). Since 1993, regularly upgraded and updated.
British Antarctic Territory. Scale 1:200000 topographic map. DOS 610 Series, Sheet W 64 62. Directorate of Overseas Surveys, Tolworth, UK, 1980.
Brabant Island to Argentine Islands. Scale 1:250000 topographic map. British Antarctic Survey, 2008.

Further reading 
 Defense Mapping Agency  1992, Sailing Directions (planning Guide) and (enroute) for Antarctica, P 341

External links 

 Guyou Bay on USGS website
 Guyou Bay on AADC website
 Guyou Bay on SCAR website

References 

Bays of the Palmer Archipelago
Brabant Island